Half Widow is a 2017 Indian drama film directed by debutant Danish Renzu and written by Renzu and Gaya Bhola. The film tells the story of a woman from Srinagar in Kashmir, who tries to find her husband who is abducted by the Indian army. Jointly produced by Bhola and Renzu, the film stars Neelofar Hamid, Shahnawaz Bhat, Mir Sarwar and Haseena Sofi. Because there are no theaters in Kashmir, the film was screened at the Sher-i-Kashmir International Conference Centre. 
The title of the film refers to the namesake term used for Kashmiri women whose husbands have disappeared mostly in custody of security forces in the Kashmir conflict. The film's official trailer was released in May 2017. The characters in the film talk in Urdu, with some Kashmiri. The film received a favourable review on Cineblitz. The film was released theatrically on 6 January 2020 in India.

Cast
Neelofar Hamid	as Neela
Shahnawaz Bhat as Zakir
Mir Sarwar as Khalid
Haseena Sofi as Khala
Rhonda Leal as Eva
Yasmeena Wani as Zumba 
Ayaan Sikander as Faizan

Production
Director Danish Renzu was doing a job at AT&T in the United States. He came back to India in 2015 as he wanted to "tell stories from my world and the place I grew up in" that need attention and platform. The film was shot in the valleys of Kashmir with local cast and crew. Sheikh Neelofar handled the casting part and approached some actors including a Bollywood actor Mir Sarwar.  Due to the local people involved Renzu was able to shoot the film in several unexplored locations. The last schedule of filming was delayed due to the 2016 Kashmir Uprising in the valley. The film's dialogue writer Sunayana Kachroo, who is a poet, said that she felt the need to tell this story as "men in conflict zones are celebrated, decorated, and revered for their heroism", but the women and children are referred to as "the bystanders of the discord". She further said: "The first and the last victims of war are always the women and the children and, due to this, they are also the torchbearers of change and progress."

Reception 
Niyati Bhat of The Hindu wrote: "'Half Widow' does not fall into the Bollywood trap of the formula Kashmir film" Aakansha Naval of Cineblitz gave it 4 stars out of 5 and wrote "it's a hard look at the harrowing and emotional trauma of half widows in Kashmir, Danish Renzu’s directorial debut is storytelling at its best and not to be missed. Danish Renzu’s Half Widow differs. In fact, not just from these two films, but also from every other film that’s either been made, based, set or shot in Kashmir!" Keyur Seta of Cinestaan gave it 3 stars out of 4 and write: "It is a more intimate portrayal and captures the lives of ordinary Kashmiris. The simple and realistic dialogues are an example. The use of the local language in a number of places adds to the realism." Nandini Ramnath of Scroll in praised the lead actors performance and wrote: "Neelofar Hamid’s sensitive and affecting portrayal accommodates the spectrum of Neela’s emotional experiences, from loneliness to comfort in family and community, and from despair to hope. Neela’s dilemma, articulated through a voiceover by dialogue writer Sunayna Kachroo, moves away from politics towards the direction of poetics. There is immense poignancy and wistfulness in Neela’s ruminations. The seasons change, but no season brought you back, Neela says to herself as she remembers Khalid." Sanjana Bhagwat of Shorted wrote: "This is just what the film is – grounded, honest and real, without any glossiness of romanticism or manipulation. Familiar songs like ‘Dilbaro’ and ‘Ae Watan’ sound starkly different without the sheen of being in a Bollywood film; they can be heard in Half Widow through the static of radios or the off-key, asynchronous hum of a children's choir."

Awards and festivals
Festivals 
CAAMFest , San Francisco
Seattle International Film Festival, Seattle
Asian Film Festival of Dallas, Dallas  
Indie Meme International Film Festival, Texas
Vancouver South Asian Film Festival, Canada
South Asian International Film Festival, New York
Innovative International Film Festival, Bangalore
2nd New Delhi Film Festival, Delhi
Le Festival des Films Indiens de Toulouse, France
Jaipur International Film Festival, Jaipur 
Tasveer South Asian Film Festival, Seattle
Chicago South Asian Film Festival, Chicago
Houston Asian American Pacific Islander Film Festival (HAAPIFest), Houston
UN Women, Los Angeles chapter (SPECIAL SCREENING)
Boston Indian and International Film Festival, Boston
Mustard Seed Film Festival of Philadelphia, Philadelphia
San Luis Obispo International Film Festival, San Luis Obispo
DC South Asian Film Festival, Washington DC
New Jersey Indian & International Film Festival, New Jersey
Caelesdoscope International Film Festival, Rhode Island
Hyderabad Bengali Film Festival, Hyderabad 
Indian Film Festival of Cincinnati, Ohio 
National Film Festival of Kerala, Kochi
Third Eye Asian Film Festival, Mumbai
Indian Film Festival Of Prague

Nominations  
Best Actress (Neelofar Hamid) - Boston Indian and International Film  Festival
Best Film - Boston Indian and International Film Festival
Le Festival des Films Indiens de Toulouse - Film Critics Circle of India Award for the Best Debut Director Danish Renzu 
In Competition at Asia Pacific Screen Awards, Australia

Awards
Audience Choice, Best Feature Film - 2017 South Asian International Film Festival, New York (world premiere)
Audience Choice, Best Feature Film - 2018 Vancouver South Asian International Film Festival, Canada
Best Film Award - 2018 New Jersey Indian and International Film Festival
Best Director Award  Danish Renzu - 2018 New Jersey Indian and International Film Festival
Best Actress (Neelofar Hamid) - 2018 Caelesdoscope International Film Festival
Best Cinematography (Antonio Cisneros) - 2018 Boston Indian and International Film  Festival, Boston
Best Film Critics Choice - 2019 Indian Film Festival of Cincinnati, Cincinnati

References

External links
 

Films set in Jammu and Kashmir
Films shot in Jammu and Kashmir
2010s Urdu-language films
Indian independent films
Kashmir conflict in films
Films scored by Alokananda Dasgupta
Films scored by Sonu Nigam
Indian Army in films
2017 drama films